KWSO (91.9 FM, "Warm Springs Radio") is a radio station that broadcasts the Hot Adult Contemporary music format. Licensed to Warm Springs, Oregon, United States, the station is currently owned by the Confederated Tribes of Warm Springs reservation.  Historically, KWSO was an AM station in Wasco, CA, operating on 1050 kHz (1950's and 60's).

See also
List of community radio stations in the United States

References

External links
 
 

Native American radio
WSO
Hot adult contemporary radio stations in the United States
Jefferson County, Oregon
NPR member stations
Community radio stations in the United States